Lee Keshav (born 27 December 1992) is an Indian Racing Driver, Entrepreneur and Creative Head of Hike.

Racing career 
From a very young age Keshav showed interest in automobiles, technology and speed. He soon discovered Formula 1 on TV and was inspired to pursue motor racing.

Motorcycles
Keshav got his first taste of racing from motorcycles. He was very passionate about MotoGP and visited Thailand at the age of 16 to train on Superbikes. He was soon invited by the prestigious Red Bull MotoGP Rookies Cup to Spain for a selection event. Due to his inexperience in comparison to other professionals, he was not able to make it to the academy. However, Keshav admits the exposure he received helped him pursue his racing dreams.

Switch to Cars
After a small stint with bikes, Keshav decided to give racing another shot and this time he made a switch to car racing. He received his first training on car racing from renowned ex Indian F3 champion Akbar Ebrahim. The training helped him quickly get used to 4 wheels and played an important part in getting him through the tough selection event for the VW Polo R Cup Championship.

JK Tyre Indian National Championship
Keshav made his national level debut in the highly competitive JK Tyre Volkswagen Motorsport Polo R Cup championship. He finished 6th overall out of 20 drivers and 2nd in the Junior category. Earning multiple podiums and many times taking the fight to the more experienced drivers. He also won the 'Fastest and Fittest Young Driver that year'.

In 2014 Keshav returned for a second year in the VW Polo R Cup Championship. This time with experience behind him Keshav was soon considered a strong contender for the championship title.

He scored multiple wins  and podiums and was one of the fastest drivers throughout the year. Due to an unlucky crash in the final round of the championship Keshav was taken out by another driver and failed to finish the race. This lost him valuable points and eventually the championship. In an interview with Times Now Keshav showed his disappointment on losing the championship but vowed to return stronger in the future.

At the final round of the championship Keshav also competed in the Formula BMW (known as JKFB02) as a guest driver. His best result was only a 7th position as he struggled to get used to the new car and tires while also racing the Polo R Cup car on the same weekend.

MRF National Racing Championship
After only one year of national level racing Keshav made a bold move to enter the MRF Formula Ford 1600 championship.

Keshav quickly got up to speed and made a surprise 2nd-place finish in only the second round of the championship. He carried the momentum and started competing with the top experienced drivers and earned more podiums in the following rounds. At the final round of the championship Keshav also scored his first win at the Buddh International Circuit in front of his home crowd. He eventually finished a brilliant 3rd overall in the championship.

MRF Challenge
Just two weeks after his win in the national championship Keshav managed a last minute entry in the highly acclaimed MRF Challenge winter championship. This marked Keshav's international racing debut and made him one of the fastest progressing drivers from India and the only active international formula racing driver from New Delhi. He competed against the likes of Freddie Hunt and Mathias Lauda amongst other top racing drivers from around the world.

Break from Racing and the Comeback
Keshav's racing progress slowed down in the next couple of years that followed. He took part in limited races in 2016 - 2017 in the National Racing Championship  and focused more on doing promotional events with BMW India like the BMW M Driver Training in Germany and India.

Keshav admits he had to step back from Racing as it was starting to burn him out and his alternative career as a Product Designer was taking off. He took a long hiatus from racing but always showed an intent to return. Most recently, Keshav revealed his plans to make a come back in Racing in 2022 and beyond.

Entrepreneurship and Startup Career
Apart from motor racing, Keshav was always passionate about the technology industry. At the young age of 16 Keshav founded his own App design firm and learned about the new wave of mobile startups around the world. In 2011 he joined BSB (Bharti Softbank) as a Senior Product Designer. Working under the wings of CEO Kavin Bharti Mittal he led Product Design for Hike Messenger and Airtel's Wynk Music.

Keshav took a break from Hike in 2015 and went on to work with some other startups in India like Oyo Rooms, Foxy India and most prominently Niti Aayog (Govt. of India's Think Tank) where he advised as an industry leader on the Women Entrepreneurship Platform. In 2019 Keshav returned to Hike India and took on the role of Creative Head.

Personal life 
Keshav is originally from New Delhi and is now based in Dubai. His Instagram shows him traveling to various countries and events for his racing and work. Keshav maintains a low profile with the media.

References

External links
 
 
 

1992 births
Living people
Indian racing drivers
JK Tyre National Level Racing Championship drivers
MRF Challenge Formula 2000 Championship drivers